The 63rd New York State Legislature, consisting of the New York State Senate and the New York State Assembly, met from January 7 to May 14, 1840, during the second year of William H. Seward's governorship, in Albany.

Background
Under the provisions of the New York Constitution of 1821, 32 Senators were elected on general tickets in eight senatorial districts for four-year terms. They were divided into four classes, and every year eight Senate seats came up for election. Assemblymen were elected countywide on general tickets to a one-year term, the whole Assembly being renewed annually.

State Senator Noadiah Johnson died on April 4, 1839; and State Senator Edward P. Livingston resigned on October 9, 1839; leaving two vacancies in the Third District.

At this time there were two political parties: the Democratic Party and the Whig Party.

Elections
The State election was held from November 4 to 6, 1839.

State Senator John Hunter (2nd D.) was re-elected.

Sessions
The Legislature met for the regular session at the Old State Capitol in Albany on January 7, 1840; and adjourned on May 14.

George W. Patterson (W) was re-elected Speaker with 68 votes against 56 for Levi S. Chatfield (D).

Upon taking their seats in the Senate, Humphrey, Sanford and Root drew lots to decide which one of the three senators elected in the Third District would serve which term. Sanford drew the one-year term, Humphrey the two-year term, and Root the full term.

On January 14, the Legislature elected Nathaniel P. Tallmadge (W) to the seat in the U.S. Senate which he had vacated on March 4, 1839.

On January 20, Mayor of Rochester Samuel G. Andrews was elected Clerk of the Senate, to succeed John F. Bacon who had been Clerk since 1814.

The Legislature appointed Thurlow Weed to succeed Edwin Croswell as State Printer.

On February 3, Lt. Gov. Bradish did not attend the session, and Frederick A. Tallmadge was elected president pro tempore of the Senate. On the same day, Jacob Haight (W) was re-elected State Treasurer.

On February 22, the Legislature elected George H. Boughton, Simon Newton Dexter, Henry Hamilton, David Hudson and Asa Whitney to succeed William Baker, William C. Bouck, John Bowman, Jonas Earll, Jr. and State Senator Samuel Young as Canal Commissioners.

On September 2, the Democratic state convention met at Syracuse, and nominated William C. Bouck for Governor, and State Senator Daniel S. Dickinson for Lieutenant Governor.

The Whig state convention nominated Gov. Seward and Lt. Gov. Bradish for re-election.

State Senate

Districts
 The First District (4 seats) consisted of Kings, New York and Richmond counties.
 The Second District (4 seats) consisted of Dutchess, Orange, Putnam, Queens, Rockland, Suffolk, Sullivan, Ulster and Westchester counties.
 The Third District (4 seats) consisted of Albany, Columbia, Delaware, Greene, Rensselaer, Schenectady and Schoharie counties.
 The Fourth District (4 seats) consisted of Clinton, Essex, Franklin, Fulton, Hamilton, Herkimer, Montgomery, St. Lawrence, Saratoga, Warren and Washington counties.
 The Fifth District (4 seats) consisted of Jefferson, Lewis, Madison, Oneida, Oswego and Otsego counties.
 The Sixth District (4 seats) consisted of Allegany, Broome, Cattaraugus, Chemung, Chenango, Livingston, Steuben, Tioga and Tompkins counties.
 The Seventh District (4 seats) consisted of Cayuga, Cortland, Onondaga, Ontario, Seneca, Wayne and Yates counties.
 The Eighth District (4 seats) consisted of Chautauqua, Erie, Genesee, Monroe, Niagara and Orleans counties.

Note: There are now 62 counties in the State of New York. The counties which are not mentioned in this list had not yet been established, or sufficiently organized, the area being included in one or more of the abovementioned counties.

Members
The asterisk (*) denotes members of the previous Legislature who continued in office as members of this Legislature.

Employees
 Clerk: John F. Bacon, until January 20, 1840
Samuel G. Andrews, from January 20, 1840
 Sergeant-at-Arms: Richard M. Meigs
 Doorkeeper: Philip M. De Zeng
 Assistant Doorkeeper: Chauncey Dexter, from January 25, 1840

State Assembly

Districts

 Albany County (3 seats)
 Allegany County (2 seats)
 Broome County (1 seat)
 Cattaraugus County (2 seats)
 Cayuga County (3 seats)
 Chautauqua County (3 seats)
 Chemung County (1 seat)
 Chenango County (3 seats)
 Clinton County (1 seat)
 Columbia County (3 seats)
 Cortland County (2 seats)
 Delaware County (2 seats)
 Dutchess County (3 seats)
 Erie County (3 seats)
 Essex County (1 seat)
 Franklin County (1 seat)
 Fulton and Hamilton counties (1 seat)
 Genesee County (4 seats)
 Greene County (2 seats)
 Herkimer County (2 seats)
 Jefferson County (3 seats)
 Kings County (2 seats)
 Lewis County (1 seat)
 Livingston County (2 seats)
 Madison County (3 seats)
 Monroe County (3 seats)
 Montgomery County (2 seats)
 The City and County of New York (13 seats)
 Niagara County (2 seats)
 Oneida County (4 seats)
 Onondaga County (4 seats)
 Ontario County (3 seats)
 Orange County (3 seats)
 Orleans County (1 seat)
 Oswego County (2 seats)
 Otsego County (3 seats)
 Putnam County (1 seat)
 Queens County (1 seat)
 Rensselaer County (3 seats)
 Richmond County (1 seat)
 Rockland County (1 seat)
 St. Lawrence County (2 seats)
 Saratoga County (2 seats)
 Schenectady County (1 seat)
 Schoharie County (2 seats)
 Seneca County (1 seat)
 Steuben County (3 seats)
 Suffolk County (2 seats)
 Sullivan County (1 seat)
 Tioga County (1 seat)
 Tompkins County (2 seats)
 Ulster County (2 seats)
 Warren County (1 seat)
 Washington (2 seats)
 Wayne County (2 seats)
 Westchester County (2 seats)
 Yates County (1 seat)

Note: There are now 62 counties in the State of New York. The counties which are not mentioned in this list had not yet been established, or sufficiently organized, the area being included in one or more of the abovementioned counties.

Assemblymen
The asterisk (*) denotes members of the previous Legislature who continued as members of this Legislature.

Party affiliations follow the result given in The New Yorker.

Employees
 Clerk: Philander B. Prindle
 Sergeant-at-Arms: Minos McGowen
 Doorkeeper: Samuel Francis Jr.
 Assistant Doorkeeper: Abraham H. Grovesteen

Notes

Sources
 The New York Civil List compiled by Franklin Benjamin Hough (Weed, Parsons and Co., 1858) [pg. 109 and 441 for Senate districts; pg. 132 for senators; pg. 148f for Assembly districts; pg. 223f for assemblymen]
 The History of Political Parties in the State of New-York, from the Ratification of the Federal Constitution to 1840 by Jabez D. Hammond (4th ed., Vol. 2, Phinney & Co., Buffalo, 1850; pg. 517 to 528)
 The Politician's Register published by Horace Greeley (1840; pg. 55f)
A Political Register for 1840 published by E. C. Markley (Philadelphia, 1840; pg. 17f)
The New Yorker (issue of November 16, 1839)

063
1840 in New York (state)
1840 U.S. legislative sessions